The 2011 Coates Hire Ipswich 300 was a motor race for the Australian sedan-based V8 Supercars racing cars. It was the eighth event of the 2011 International V8 Supercars Championship. It was held on the weekend of August 19 to 21 at Queensland Raceway, near Ipswich, Queensland. It was the ninth running of the Queensland 300 and the 15th V8 Supercar event held at Queensland Raceway.

The event hosted races 16, 17 and 18 of the 2011 season in a unique three-race format. Two 22 lap, 70-kilometre races were run on Saturday split by a fifteen-minute 'service window', while Sunday saw a single 65-lap, 200-kilometre race. The pointscore was adjusted for the event, with 75 points going to the winner of each Saturday race before the normal pointscore was used on Sunday. The qualifying format for Races 16 and 18 remained the same as other events while the grid for Race 17 was based on the finishing results of Race 16.

Triple Eight Race Engineering driver Craig Lowndes dominated the event, taking both pole positions and winning all three races. Tim Slade had an impressive weekend for James Rosenberg Racing, finishing in the top three in each race and keeping pace with Lowndes and Lowndes' team mate Jamie Whincup. After finishing both Saturday races on the podium, Whincup's weekend took a turn for the worse when an engine trumpet cover was accidentally left on his car at the beginning of Race 18. Whincup was forced to vacate his front row grid spot and enter the pits to fix the issue. His race was made worse when he received a black flag for speeding in pitlane. Whincup fought back through the field to finish in 10th, setting a new lap record along the way.

Lowndes, Slade and Whincup were the standout performers of the weekend, with most others having mediocre results. The Holden Racing Team's Garth Tander experienced a flat tyre at the end of Race 16 after contact with Paul Dumbrell which dropped him to last place and meant he would start Race 17 from 28th position. Tander fought his way through the field only to be turned around by Jason Bargwanna, who was given a 25-point penalty for causing the incident. Ford Performance Racing had a very disappointing weekend, struggling to find pace on the soft tyres. Shane van Gisbergen took the final podium place on Sunday, albeit some thirty seconds off the lead. James Moffat scored his career best result, finishing fourth on Sunday, and David Reynolds scored his second top five finish of the season in the same race.

Lowndes scored the maximum of 300 points for the weekend while Slade scored 272 with his three podium finishes. Despite his Sunday problems, Whincup still managed to score the third highest points total for the weekend with 212. The weekend saw Whincup's championship lead over Lowndes decrease from 186 to 98.

Results
Results as follows:

Qualifying Race 16
Qualifying timesheet:

Race 16
Race timesheets:

Race 17
Race timesheets:

Qualifying Race 18
Qualifying timesheet:

Race 18
Race timesheets:

Standings
 After 18 of 28 races.

References

Coates Hire Ipswich 300